1st Missouri Infantry may refer to:

1st Missouri Infantry Regiment (Union), a Union regiment during the American Civil War
1st Missouri Infantry (Confederate), a Confederate regiment during the American Civil War
1st Missouri Regiment of Colored Infantry, a Union African-American regiment during the American Civil War

See also
1st and 4th Missouri Infantry (Consolidated)
1st Missouri Light Artillery Regiment, a Union regiment created by converting the 1st Missouri Infantry Regiment (Union) to artillery